The 1903 Maryland Aggies football team represented Maryland Agricultural College (later part of the University of Maryland) in the 1903 college football season. In their second season under head coach D. John Markey, the Aggies compiled a 7–4 record and outscored their opponents, 104 to 64.

Schedule

References

Maryland
Maryland Terrapins football seasons
Maryland Aggies football